Kornilovo is a rural locality (a selo) and the administrative center of Kornilovsky Selsoviet, Kamensky District, Altai Krai, Russia. The population was 1,350 as of 2013. There are 26 streets.

Geography 
Kornilovo is located 38 km southwest of Kamen-na-Obi (the district's administrative centre) by road. Podvetrenno-Teleutskoye is the nearest rural locality.

References 

Rural localities in Kamensky District, Altai Krai